Catch As Catch Can: The Collected Stories and Other Writings is a 2003 collection of writings by Joseph Heller, author of Catch-22.

List of writings

Previously published stories
"I Don't Love You Any More" (1945)
"Bookies, Beware!" (1947)
"Lot's Wife" (1948)
"Castle of Snow" (1948)
"Girl from Greenwich" (1948)
"A Man Named Flute" (1948)
"Nothing to Be Done" (1948)
"World Full of Great Cities" (1955)
"MacAdam's Log" (1959)
"Love, Dad" (1969)
"Yossarian Survives" (1987)
"Catch-23" (1990)
"The Day Bush Left" (1990)
"The Principal of Rivington Street" (2011)

Previously unpublished stories
"To Laugh in the Morning"
"A Day in the Country"
"From Dawn to Dusk"
"The Death of the Dying Swan"
"The Sound of Asthma"

Play
"Clevinger's Trial" (1973)

Essays on Catch-22
"Catch-22 Revisited" (1967)
"Joseph Heller Talks About Catch-22" (1972)
"Reeling In Catch-22" (1977)
"I Am the Bombardier!" (1995)

References

2003 short story collections
Short story collections by Joseph Heller
Catch-22
Jewish American short story collections